The Division of Ryan is an Australian Electoral Division in Queensland.

History

The division was created in 1949 and is named after T. J. Ryan, Premier of Queensland from 1915 to 1919.

In the 2001 federal election, Liberal candidate Michael Johnson was elected. He served as the member for Ryan until he was expelled from the Liberal Party. Johnson subsequently ran as an independent in the 2010 federal election but lost.

Since 2016 there has been a growing Greens vote, gaining 20% of the first-preference vote in the 2019 federal election. In the 2022 election, Greens candidate Elizabeth Watson-Brown won the seat from LNP member Julian Simmonds.

Location
Since 1984, federal electoral division boundaries in Australia have been determined at redistributions by a redistribution committee appointed by the Australian Electoral Commission. Redistributions occur for the boundaries of divisions in a particular state, and they occur every seven years, or sooner if a state's representation entitlement changes or when divisions of a state are malapportioned.

Ryan is located in south east Queensland, and is generally based on the western suburbs of the City of Brisbane.

The Division of Ryan encompasses a number of whole and part suburbs and localities:

 Anstead
 Ashgrove (western and north-western part)
 Auchenflower
 Banks Creek (within City of Brisbane)
 Bardon (southern part)
 Bellbowrie
 Brookfield
 Chapel Hill
 England Creek (within City of Brisbane)
 Enoggera (western part)
 Enoggera Reservoir
 Ferny Grove
 Fig Tree Pocket
 Gaythorne
 Indooroopilly
 Kenmore
 Kenmore Hills
 Keperra
 Lake Manchester (within City of Brisbane)
 Mitchelton
 Moggill
 Mount Coot-tha
 Paddington (southern part)
 Pinjarra Hills
 Pullenvale
 St Lucia
 Taringa
 The Gap
 Toowong
 Upper Brookfield
 Upper Kedron

Members

Election results

References

External links
 Division of Ryan (Qld) — Australian Electoral Commission

Electoral divisions of Australia
Constituencies established in 1984
1984 establishments in Australia
Federal politics in Queensland